Leon Young (1924–2001) served as the first African-American mayor of Colorado Springs, Colorado.

Biography
Young was born in 1924 in West Monroe, Louisiana. He was raised by his grandparents after his father died when he was 5 and his mother when he was 10. Having to work, he did not complete the 10th grade. At the age of 18, he moved to Colorado Springs where his aunt lived. He enrolled at Colorado Springs High School but dropped out to work at a shoe repair store and later as a doorman and bartender at the El Paso Club. In 1943, he enlisted in the US Navy where he served during World War II. In 1945, he returned to Colorado Springs and founded Young Janitorial Services which went on to become one of the most successful Black-owned businesses in Colorado. In 1973, he was elected to the Colorado Springs City Council despite Colorado Springs being  86.6% White in 1970. In 1981, he was unanimously appointed as Vice Mayor where he served until 1997. In 1997, he was elevated to interim Mayor after the early retirement and resignation of mayor Bob Isaac becoming the first African-American mayor of the city. He continued to serve on the City Council until his death in 2001.

Personal life
In 1945, he married Margaret; they had a daughter, Denise Young Smith, in 1955.

References

1924 births
2001 deaths
African-American mayors in Colorado
Mayors of Colorado Springs, Colorado
People from Colorado Springs, Colorado
People from West Monroe, Louisiana
African-American people in Colorado politics
United States Navy personnel of World War II
African Americans in World War II
African-American United States Navy personnel